In mathematics, a ternary operation is an n-ary operation with n = 3. A ternary operation on a set A takes any given three elements of A and combines them to form a single element of A.

In computer science, a ternary operator is an operator that takes three arguments as input and returns one output.

Examples 

Properties of this ternary operation have been used to define planar ternary rings in the foundations of projective geometry.

In the Euclidean plane with points a, b, c referred to an origin, the ternary operation  has been used to define free vectors. Since (abc) = d implies a – b = c – d, these directed segments are equipollent and are associated with the same free vector. Any three points in the plane a, b, c thus determine a parallelogram with d at the fourth vertex.

In projective geometry, the process of finding a projective harmonic conjugate is a ternary operation on three points. In the diagram, points A, B and P determine point V, the harmonic conjugate of P with respect to A and B. Point R and the line through P can be selected arbitrarily, determining C and D. Drawing AC and BD produces the intersection Q, and RQ then yields V.

Properties of this ternary relation have been used to set the axioms for a heap.

In Boolean algebra,  defines the formula .

Computer science 

In computer science, a ternary operator is an operator that takes three arguments (or operands). The arguments and result can be of different types. Many programming languages that use C-like syntax feature a ternary operator, ?:, which defines a conditional expression. In some languages, this operator is referred to as the conditional operator.

In Python, the ternary conditional operator reads x if C else y. Python also supports ternary operations called array slicing, e.g. a[b:c] return an array where the first element is a[b] and last element is a[c-1]. OCaml expressions provide ternary operations against records, arrays, and strings: a.[b]<-c would mean the string a where index b has value c.

The multiply–accumulate operation is another ternary operator.

Another example of a ternary operator is between, as used in SQL.

The Icon programming language has a "to-by" ternary operator: the expression 1 to 10 by 2 generates the odd integers from 1 through 9.

In Excel formulae, the form is =if(C, x, y).

See also 
 Median algebra
 ?: for a list of ternary operators in computer programming languages

References

External links